Prince Cecil is an Indian actor who appears in Telugu films. He is best known for his film Bus Stop. He was one of the contestants on the reality TV show Bigg Boss Telugu.

Career
Prince Cecil was studying B.Tech at Baba institute of technology and sciences, when director Teja came to Visakhapatnam for a male lead for his film, Neeku Naaku Dash Dash. After being recommended to audition, he got through the initial selection and attended a film workshop for the final candidates before being picked to play the lead role. Within two months of the release of his first film, Prince was offered another film named Bus Stop by director Maruthi, and that film became a large commercial success. His third and fourth releases, Romance and Bunny n Cherry (2013), opened to negative reviews and failed at the box office. He then featured in the bilingual films, Manasunu Maaya Seyake alongside an ensemble cast of Sethu, Disha Pandey and Richa Panai, but the film had a low key release in January 2014.

Filmography

Film

Television

References

External links

1993 births
Living people
Telugu male actors
Male actors in Telugu cinema
Indian male film actors
Male actors from Visakhapatnam
21st-century Indian male actors
Bigg Boss (Telugu TV series) contestants